"Life to Fix" is a song by the American alternative rock band The Record Company. The song is the lead single from their second studio album All of This Life, and was released on April 20, 2018.

Release 
On April 14, 2018, the band announced that they had finished recording their new album. Two days later, on April 16, the band released a teaser for the song on their Instagram and announced that it would be coming out on April 20.

Reception 
NPR described "Life to Fix" as a track that "takes off like a supersonic jet blowing wildly through the universe of rock," adding, "It's got seventh-inning stretch stadium rock anthem written all over it."

"Rolling Stone" named it one of their "10 Best Country and Americana Songs of the Week" for the week of April 20, 2018, describing it as "a rough-and-tumble ode to hitting rock bottom and building yourself 'back up, brick by brick.'"

Promotion 
"Life to Fix was sent to adult album alternative stations on April 30, 2018, and to active rock stations a day later on May 1, 2018.

Music video 
A lyric video for the song was released on April 18, 2018.

Track list

CD single

Digital download

Charts

References 

2018 songs
2018 singles
American alternative rock songs
Song articles with missing songwriters